Penn Hill is an electoral ward in Poole, Dorset. Since 2019, the ward has elected 2 councillors to Bournemouth, Christchurch and Poole Council.

History 
The ward formerly elected three councillors to Poole Borough Council.

Geography 
The ward covers the suburb of the same name.

Councillors 
Two Conservative Party.

Election results

2019

References 

Wards of Bournemouth, Christchurch and Poole
Politics of Poole